The 1992 Pacific Curling Championships were held from November 1 to ??? in Karuizawa, Japan for men's teams only. 

Australia won the men's event over Japan (it was the second Pacific title for the Australian men).

By virtue of winning, the Australian men's team qualified for the 1993 World Men's Curling Championship in Geneva, Switzerland.

Men

Teams

Best of Five Series

Final standings

References

External links

Pacific Curling Championships, 1992
Pacific-Asia Curling Championships
International curling competitions hosted by Japan
1992 in Japanese sport
Sport in Nagano Prefecture
November 1992 sports events in Asia
Karuizawa, Nagano